Arvaikheer, also spelt Arwaiheer ("Barley Steppe") is the capital of Övörkhangai Aimag (province) and one of the most central points of Mongolia.

It is a centre for traditional crafts, goat herding and equestrian sports, and hosts a large regional horse festival every year. Arvaikheer has a population of 19,058 (2000 census), 23,298 (2004 est.), 24,954 (2006 est.), 25,622 (2008 est.). Arvaikheer is by far the largest town in the aimag.

Climate
Arvaikheer has a cold semi-arid climate (Köppen climate classification BSk) with mild summers and relatively mild winters by Mongolian standards. The 30 degrees Celsius difference between average January and average July temperature makes it the mildest place in Mongolia, along with Tsetserleg in Arkhangai Province. It is located in a microclimate in the center of Mongolia which sees less harsh winters than the rest of the country. Its  elevation at the foot of the eastern hills of the Khangai Mountains augments its mildness by keeping it distant from cold air pools in low basins. Most precipitation falls in the summer as rain, with some snow in March, April and October. Winters are very dry.

Transportation 
The Arvaykheer Airport has one unpaved runway and is served by regular flights to Ulaanbaatar and Altai. Arvaikheer is linked to Ulaanbaatar by a paved road and can be reached by public buses from the capital.

Sights and Infrastructure 
Until 1990, Arvaikheer was the headquarters of a large division of the Soviet Army which had a profound influence on daily life in the town. After the fall of Soviet Communism, however, many public buildings were renovated or rebuilt, e.g. the Sports' Palace in the eastern part of the town. A large park was laid out opposite. Another public park is being laid out in the west of the town center. Planting trees and flowers is difficult in Arvaikheer, as the climate is dry and the annual precipitations are just 254,2 mm per year. Most of the inhabitants do not live in yurts, but in houses built of stone.

There are several interesting modern buildings in the town center, e.g. the urban administration building and the theatre, which have recently been renovated, in the central square. The high street of Arvaikheer is a broad tree-lined avenue where two monuments dating from the times of the Mongolian People's Republic before 1990 are worth a visit as well.

Gandan Muntsaglan Khiid is a comparatively large monastery located about one mile from the central square. By order of Khorloogiin Choibalsan, it was destroyed in 1937, but reopened in 1991. As of 2008, about 60 monks live there.

The Aimag Museum where various fossils and artifacts from Karakorum can be seen is worth a visit as well. Another museum is  dedicated to the artist, Zanabazar.

Arvaikheer has a large hospital, a kindergarten and various schools and colleges. There are three hotels, an internet café and restaurants in the center. In comparison to other towns in Mongolia, Arvaikheer offers a large variety of shops.

References 

Districts of Övörkhangai Province
Aimag centers